Goya is a crater on Mercury. It has a diameter of 135 kilometers. Its name was adopted by the International Astronomical Union (IAU) in 1976. Goya is named for the Spanish artist Francisco Goya, who lived from 1746 to 1828.

References

Impact craters on Mercury